Michael William Sammes (19 February 1928 – 19 May 2001) was an English musician and vocal session arranger, performing backing vocals on pop music recorded in the UK from 1955 to the 1970s.

Career
Born in Reigate, Surrey, Sammes was the son of pioneer photographer and film-maker Rowland Sammes. He began his interest in music by learning the cello and played in the school orchestra at Reigate Grammar School. He then worked briefly for the music publisher Chappell & Co. in London. He returned to music after national service in the RAF in the late 1940s when he formed a male vocal group called the Coronets at the urging of fellow musician Bill Shepherd. The Coronets did back-up work for the Big Ben Banjo Band and recorded for Columbia Records, releasing some covers of current hits.

After Shepherd withdrew, Sammes persisted. By 1957, he had assembled the core group that would form the Mike Sammes Singers, finding them soon steadily employed, for singers, soundtrack and radio jingles, working sometimes as many as four sessions in a day and up to six days a week. Mike Sammes was Mr Sowerberry on the 1960 soundtrack (World Record Club) of the Lionel Bart musical Oliver! and the Michael (sic) Sammes Singers also featured. They appeared on the Morecambe and Wise Show (on 29 January 1966) in the sketch "The Ernie Wise Male Voice Choir".

The Mike Sammes Singers performed the title themes for three of Gerry Anderson's shows, Supercar, Stingray, and The Secret Service.  The group recorded seven albums between 1962 and 1988. In addition, they performed on numerous albums for Disneyland Records. Among the many hit singles featuring the Mike Sammes Singers are "No Other Love" (Ronnie Hilton), "A Handful of Songs" (Tommy Steele), "Why?" and "Strawberry Fair" (Anthony Newley), "Walkin' Back to Happiness" (Helen Shapiro), "The Last Waltz" (Engelbert Humperdinck), "Green Green Grass of Home" and "Delilah" (Tom Jones) and "Tears" by Ken Dodd.

The singers departed from their usual commercial style when they provided backing vocals for the Beatles' song "I Am the Walrus", which required them to do "all sorts of swoops and phonetic noises" and chant the phrases "ho ho ho, he he he, ha ha ha", "oompah, oompah, stick it up your jumper" and "everybody's got one". They also sang on the Beatles' "Good Night", as well as on their last album, Let It Be, at the behest of Phil Spector. Sammes also provided the distinctive basso backing vocals on Olivia Newton-John's early country crossover hits, including "Banks of the Ohio", "Let Me Be There" and "If You Love Me (Let Me Know)". Despite this productivity, his group, the Mike Sammes Singers, have only one entry in The Guinness Book of British Hit Singles, for "Somewhere My Love" in July 1967. 
Sammes rewrote the song "Marianne" with Bill Owen to provide Cliff Richard with a minor hit in September 1968.

The Mike Sammes Singers remained active into the 1970s, producing recordings for television (The Secret Service) and appearing on the small screen (the Val Doonican Show, 1971). By the mid-1970s, though, the demand for backing vocals had faded considerably, due to the introduction of multi-tracking and synthesizers. On "The Last of the Summer Wine", the Mike Sammes Singers contributed the "Summer Wine" song over the opening credits of the Christmas 1983 episode "Getting Sam Home".

Sammes died at the age of 73 in May 2001, several months after a fall from which he never fully recovered. Jonny Trunk, of Trunk Records, was able to recover a number of reel-to-reel tapes from Sammes' house (despite it having been ransacked by house clearance), which he went on to compile as Music for Biscuits, so-named because it featured 1960s/1970s advertising jingles for Tuc biscuits, etc.

The Michael Sammes Singers members included: Mike Sammes, John O'Neill, Irene King, Enid Hurd (Enid Heard), Mike Redway, Ross Gilmour, Valerie Bain, Marion Gay and Mel Todd.

Works

 Johnny Kidd & the Pirates: HMV 45rpm 45-POP 978: 1962: accompanied 'Hurry on Back to Love', and 'I Want That'.
The Young Ones (soundtrack, 1962)
 "I May Never Pass This Way Again" 1958, with Ronnie Hilton (UK #27)
 "Come prima" (1959)
 "Starry Eyed" January 1960
 Supercar (TV series 1961)
 "When the Girl in Your Arms Is the Girl in Your Heart" (1961)
 Young, Willing and Eager 1961
 Stork Talk (1962) 85 minute film
 Summer Holiday (1963)
 Here Come the Girls (TV series) 1963
 "Crow on the Cradle" (1963)
 Aladdin and His Wonderful Lamp (Cliff Richard and the Shadows album) (1964)
 Frank Ifield Sings (TV Series) 1965, as Mike Sammes Singers
 "A Windmill in Old Amsterdam" (1965 song)
 Presenting Johnny Mathis (TV Movie) 1965, as Mike Sammes Singers
 The Bed-Sit Girl (TV Series 1966)
 '"Careless Hands" (song 1967)
 Don't Lose Your Head (1967 film)
 The Benny Hill Show (TV special 1967)
 "I Am The Walrus" (The Beatles 1967)
 "Good Night" (The Beatles 1968)
 Oh, Brother! (TV series 1968–1970)
 Saturday Stars (TV series) 1968  as Mike Sammes Singers, with Engelbert Humperdinck and Tony Bennett
 Q... (TV series) 1969
 A Song for Everyone (UK TV Series 1969)
 Youth Comes to Britain (Documentary short) 1970 
 The Sky's the Limit (TV series 1970)
  Kraft Music Hall Presents:The Des O'Connor Show (TV series 1971)
 It's Cliff Richard (TV series 1972)
 Patrick, Dear Patrick an Evening with Patrick Cargill and His Guests (TV movie) 1972
 Oh, Father! (TV series 1973)
 Tiffany Jones (1973 film)
 Thomas and the King (1975 stage musical)
 Thrillington (Percy "Thrills" Thrillington, 1977; recorded 1971)
 Joseph and the Amazing Technicolor Dreamcoat (Paul Jones / Tim Rice / Geoff Love Orchestra)
 Last of the Summer Wine (TV series 1983)

References

External links

Trunk Records.com

1928 births
2001 deaths
English male singers
British music arrangers
Music directors
People from Reigate
20th-century English singers
20th-century British male singers